Julian R. Dridan (born November 1941) was Engineer-in-Chief of South Australia's Engineering and Water Supply Department from 1949 to 1966.

Career 
Julian Dridan was educated at Adelaide Junior Technical School, the School of Mines and Adelaide University. He became South Australia's Deputy Engineer-in-Chief focussing on Engineering and Water Supply. In November 1949, on his 48th birthday, he succeeded the late Mr. H. T. Angwin as Engineer-in-Chief.

He had previously reported on several proposed schemes to augment Broken Hill's water supply, including the Menindee-Stephens Creek pipeline. The scheme, with some modifications, was finally adopted following a favorable report by him. 1965-1966 He was both Director and Engineer-in-Chief of South Australia's Engineering and Water Supply Department.

Publications 
 J. R. Dridan: Water conservation in South Australia. Published by K.M. Stevenson, Government Printer, Adelaide, 1946.

References

Public servants of South Australia
1941 births
Living people